Hafız Süleymanoğlu (born January 23, 1967), formerly known as Hafız Süleymanov, is a retired Turkish weightlifter of Azerbaijani origin competing in bantamweight and featherweight divisions. He held world and European champion titles.

Career
He started weightlifting at the age of 15 in Azerbaijan. In 1985, he was admitted to the national team of the Soviet Union. He earned European and world champion titles in juniors category. In 1989, Hafız Süleymanov became world and European champion in seniors category for the Soviet Union.

After his participation at the 1989 World Weightlifting Championships, he defected from the Azerbaijan Soviet Socialist Republic and immigrated to Turkey. He earned his first medal for Turkey in gold in the -56 kg snatch division at the 1990 World Weightlifting Championships held in Budapest, Hungary. Unfortunately, he broke his arm during the clean and jerk session. He received various medals in world and European championships, and became twice more European champion, at the 1991 European Weightlifting Championships in Władysławowo, Poland in the -56 kg division and at the 1997 European Weightlifting Championships in Rijeka, Croatia in the -64 kg division.

Hafız Sülemanoğlu participated twice at the Olympics, 1992 Summer Olympics in Barcelona, Spain and 1996 Summer Olympics in Atlanta, USA. He is gold medalist in 1996 Summer Olympics in Atlanta, USA.

At the 1998 World Weightlifting Championships held in Lahti, Finland, he could reach the 9th rank only. As he repeated his unsuccessful competitions at the 1999 European Weightlifting Championships in A Coruña, Spain and at the 1999 World Weightlifting Championships in Athens, Greece, Turkey Weightlifting Federation decided to take him out of the national team. Hafız Süleymanoğlu declared thereupon that he will return to Azerbaijan.

Achievements
World Championships

European Championships

References 

1967 births
Living people
Azerbaijani male weightlifters
Turkish male weightlifters
Olympic weightlifters of Turkey
Weightlifters at the 1992 Summer Olympics
Weightlifters at the 1996 Summer Olympics
Azerbaijani emigrants to Turkey
Soviet defectors
World record setters in weightlifting
Soviet emigrants to Turkey
People from Sumgait
European champions in weightlifting
European champions for Turkey
European Weightlifting Championships medalists
World Weightlifting Championships medalists